Albert Blankert (16 June 1940 - 22 November 2022) was a Dutch art historian and expert in 17th century Dutch painting and the art of Johannes Vermeer. He was Slade Professor of Fine Art at the University of Cambridge from 1999 to 2000.

Selected publications
Vermeer of Delft: Complete edition of the paintings. Phaidon Press, 1978. 
Gods saints & heroes: Dutch painting in the age of Rembrandt. 1980.
Rembrandt: A genius and his impact. National Gallery of Victoria, Melbourne; Waanders, Zwolle; 1997.
Dutch classicism in seventeenth-century painting. Museum Boijmans van Beuningen, 1999. (Editor)

References 

1940 births
Dutch art historians
Dutch art curators
Living people
Dutch expatriates in the United Kingdom
Academics of the University of Cambridge